Carina Doyle (born 6 November 1993) is an Australian-born New Zealand Olympic swimmer. In 2018 she competed at the 2018 Commonwealth Games in the Women's 4x100m Freestyle Relay, and the Women's 100m, 200m and 400m Freestyle events.

Doyle was born in Darwin, Australia, and lived in Dunedin before moving to North Shore, Auckland.

Doyle represented New Zealand at the 2017 World University Games, where she competed in the women’s 50m freestyle, 100m freestyle, 200m freestyle and 400m freestyle. Doyle also competed at the 2016 Oceania Championships where she won silver in the 100m and 200m freestyle, the mixed 4x50m freestyle relay and the women's 4x100m freestyle relay. She also won gold in the women's 4x200m freestyle and 4x100m medley relays and bronze in the 400m freestyle.

Doyle is also a member of the New Zealand national surf life-saving team, and competed in the International Surf Rescue Challenge.

In 2019, she competed in the women's 4 × 200 metre freestyle relay at the 2019 World Aquatics Championships held in Gwangju, South Korea where New Zealand finished in 10th place in the heats.

References

1993 births
Living people
New Zealand female swimmers
Swimmers at the 2018 Commonwealth Games
Commonwealth Games competitors for New Zealand
Swimmers at the 2020 Summer Olympics
Olympic swimmers of New Zealand